Joshua Jordan, aka J.Trill, is an American hip-hop artist and rapper.  His first single "So Bright" has amassed over 340,000 views on YouTube and was featured on the MTV musical reality show Taking the Stage.

Early life

Musical career

Beginnings
Jordan's career began when he was featured in the song "Devil Walk," a promotional rap song for the Tift County High School football team.  At the time, he was going by the name "Lil Trill."  Following the overwhelming success of "Devil Walk", "Lil Trill" was asked to accompany Fabo on a remix of "Do The Heizman".

2011: Me Phi Me and "So Bright"
On March 1, 2011, Jordan released his first mixtape entitled Me Phi Me.  J.Trill began working closely with producer Gordon "Hump" Humphrey thereafter and on May 24 the first single produced by the artist/producer team "So Bright" was released on iTunes. On June 26, "So Bright" was uploaded to YouTube.  This greatly increased J.Trill's fanbase.  Jordan also credits social media as the basis of his rapid fan growth.  On August 1, it was announced that J.Trill won 1st place in the July 2011 Whooznxt contest.

2013
On March 18, 2013, Jordan released the long-awaited single and music video "Self-Medicate".

Discography
Mixtapes
Me Phi Me (2011)
Single "Jaw Dropper" Released Spring (2012)
Single "Wild Girls" Released Summer (2012)
We The Kings Single "Party,Fun,Love & Radio" Featured Artist Released Summer (2012)
It Boys! Album "Introduction" Featured Artist on "RoofTops"  Released in U.K Summer (2012)

References

External links
J.Trill on Facebook 	
J.Trill on Twitter
J.Trill on Reverbnation	
J.Trill on Youtube
J.Trill featured on Kings of A&R

1989 births
Living people
Rappers from Georgia (U.S. state)
People from Tifton, Georgia
21st-century American rappers